Alex Descas (1 january 1958) is a French actor known for his roles in films by Claire Denis and Jim Jarmusch. In France he is also known for his role as Schneider in the French TV series Un Flic.

He is a frequent collaborator of Claire Denis, appearing in more than half of her theatrical feature-length films, including No Fear, No Die, Nénette et Boni, I Can't Sleep, Trouble Every Day, The Intruder, 35 Shots of Rum and Bastards, as well as Ten Minutes Older: The Cello. He is of Antillean (Guadeloupean) descent.

Filmography

Theater

References

External links
 

Living people
French people of Guadeloupean descent
20th-century French male actors
Place of birth missing (living people)
21st-century French male actors
French male film actors
1958 births
French male television actors
Cours Florent alumni